The 1931 Wightman Cup was the ninth edition of the annual women's team tennis competition between the United States and Great Britain. It was held at the West Side Tennis Club in Forest Hills, Queens in New York City in the United States.

See also
 1931 Davis Cup

References

1931
1931 in tennis
1931 in American tennis
1931 in British sport
1931 in women's tennis